Myos Hormos ( "Shellfish's Haven") was a Red Sea port constructed by the Ptolemies around the 3rd century BC. Following excavations carried out recently by David Peacock and Lucy Blue of the University of Southampton, it is thought to have been located on the present-day site of Quseir al-Quadim (old Quseir), eight kilometres north of the modern town of El Qoseir in Egypt.

History

Myos Hormos, after the Ptolemies, was with Berenice (further south on the Red Sea coast) one of the two main ports in Roman Egypt for trade with India, Africa and probably China.

Some of its main destinations were the Indus delta, Muziris and the Kathiawar peninsula in India. The coastal trade from Myos Hormos and Berenice along the coast of the Indian Ocean is described in the anonymous 1st century AD handbook Periplus of the Erythraean Sea.
first comes Egypt's port of Myos Hormos, and beyond it, after a sail of 1800 stades to the right, Berenice. The ports of both are bays on the Red Sea on the edge of Egypt. it was one of the main trading centers on the Red Sea.

According to Strabo (II.5.12), by the time of Augustus, up to 120 ships were setting sail every year from Myos Hormos to India:

The port of Myos Hormos was connected to the Nile valley and Memphis by a Roman road, built in the 1st century.

After the 4th century the port was abandoned, because of the Roman Empire crisis and the end of the trade between Rome and India.

Only in the 17th century the port started to get again some importance, mainly because of holy travel from Cairo to Mecca. The city of old Qusair is the actual Myos Hormos.

References

Bibliography
 G.W.B. Huntingford. The Ethnology and History of the Area Covered by the Periplus in Huntingford ed., "Periplus of the Erythraean Sea" (London, 1980).

External links
 Detailed Map of Roman Egypt showing Myos Hormos

See also
El Qoseir
Berenice Troglodytica
Roman Egypt
Roman trade with India

Ancient Greek archaeological sites in Egypt
Ptolemaic colonies in the Red Sea
Roman sites in Egypt
Ports and harbours of the Red Sea
Red Sea Governorate
Archaeological sites in Egypt
Former populated places in Egypt